Ludvig Frederik Brock (20 August 1774 – 22 November 1853) was a Norwegian military officer.

References

1774 births
1853 deaths
Norwegian Army personnel
Norwegian military personnel of the Napoleonic Wars
Danish military officers